A Place to Land is the third studio album by American country music group Little Big Town. Released on  November 6, 2007, as their second album on the independent Equity Music Group label, it features the single "I'm with the Band", which peaked at number 32 on the Billboard Hot Country Songs charts in late 2007.

In 2008, the group left Equity Music Group for Capitol Records Nashville, which acquired the rights to the album. Capitol re-released the album on October 14, 2008, with extra tracks. One addition to the re-issue is a live cover of The Dream Academy's "Life in a Northern Town", which Little Big Town performed with Jake Owen and Sugarland in late 2007. This live rendition, though not released as a single, charted at number 28 on the country charts and number 43 on the Billboard Hot 100 in mid-2008. Following this live rendition were the singles "Fine Line" (which peaked at number 31) and "Good Lord Willing" (which peaked at number 43).

Track listing
All songs written by Little Big Town and Wayne Kirkpatrick except where noted.

Personnel
Little Big Town
 Karen Fairchild – vocals
 Kimberly Roads Schlapman – vocals
 Phillip Sweet – vocals, acoustic guitar, stomping
 Jimi Westbrook – vocals, acoustic guitar, Dobro, stomping

Additional musicians
 Dan Dugmore – Dobro, pedal steel guitar, lap steel guitar
 Shannon Forrest – drums
 Gordon Kennedy – acoustic guitar, electric guitar
 Wayne Kirkpatrick – acoustic guitar, 12-string guitar, National steel guitar, mandolin, mando-guitar, banjo, dulcimer, Hammond B-3 organ, clavinet, tambourine, shaker, stomping, background vocals
 Randy Kohrs – Dobro
 Chris McHugh – drums
 Phil Madeira – Hammond B-3 organ
 Jimmie Lee Sloas – bass guitar

Chart performance

Weekly charts

Year-end charts

References

2007 albums
Capitol Records Nashville albums
Equity Music Group albums
Little Big Town albums